Maadi Veettu Ezhai is a 1981 Indian Tamil language film directed by Amirtham and written by M. Karunanidhi. The film stars Sivaji Ganesan, Sujatha and Sripriya. It is a remake of the Telugu film Yedanthasthula Meda. The film was released on 22 August 1981.

Plot 

The story highlights the importance of family over money. Paramanandhan is a poor person who gets a job and ends up marrying his boss' daughter. To provide her with the same lifestyle, he works day and night building a business empire. In the process, he completely neglects his wife and son only to find her terminally ill and him a happy-go-lucky irresponsible person.

The son, Mohan, is in love with the character played by Sripriya. They get married and live without worries. Paramanandhan decides to bring some changes in his son's life, hands over the business to him and leaves. He rushes back when he learns that his son has started to walk down his path and his daughter-in-law and his son are on the verge of divorce. He fixes their life again teaching them the importance of balance in life and that the real wealth is living a joyful life.

Cast 
Sivaji Ganesan as Paramanandam / Mohan
Sujatha as Lakshmi
Sripriya
V. K. Ramasamy
Major Sundarrajan
Nagesh

Production 
In 1966, M. G. Ramachandran and J. P. Chandrababu came together for a film titled Maadi Veettu Ezhai, to be directed by the latter. Although the film began shooting, it was shelved due to differences between the two. An unrelated film was later made with the same name, written by M. Karunanidhi and starring Sivaji Ganesan.

Soundtrack 
The music was composed by M. S. Viswanathan with lyrics by Vaali.

References

Bibliography

External links 
 

1980s Tamil-language films
1981 films
Films scored by M. S. Viswanathan
Films with screenplays by M. Karunanidhi
Indian drama films
Tamil remakes of Telugu films